Larry "Flash" Jenkins (May 10, 1955 – April 25, 2019) was an American actor, film director, producer, and screenwriter.

Early life, family and education
Jenkins was born on Long Island, New York. He graduated from Fenger High School in Chicago, Illinois, where he was on the baseball and bowling teams. He attended Olive–Harvey College for a year, then Southern Illinois University for a year, then Pepperdine University in California (so he could pursue an acting career), making Dean's List at all schools.

Career

Acting
Jenkins starred in the television series The White Shadow as Wardell Stone, Bay City Blues and Finder of Lost Loves.

Jenkins was also known for his performances in minor but memorable roles in such films as Ferris Bueller's Day Off and Fletch as the junkie and informant Gummy.

Production
Jenkins founded his own production companies in October 2005, Flashworks Productions and Gold Coast Productions LLC, in Los Angeles, California.

Jenkins wrote, produced, directed and starred in the comedy film Marriage Vows (out December 2013), the gospel musical film Don't Touch, If You Ain't Prayed (2014 release) and gospel/romantic comedy House of Grace. He wrote and produced the gospel musical film Pastor Jones and produced the hip hop comedy film Ms. B's Hair Salon. All executive produced by Kenneth Halsband, who served as executive in charge of production for The Fighter and Limitless, starring Robert De Niro. Currently released on DVD/video is Brothers in Arms for Screen Gems, on which Larry served as a co-producer as well as co-starred, and Go For Broke II, which Larry starred opposite Glenn Plummer. He served as executive producer for the hit DVD film When Thugs Cry. Larry also produced and wrote the first draft for the Black Christ Film titled Color of the Cross.

Personal life
From 1984 to 1996, Larry was married to Michele Jenkins. He married Jean Coleman Jenkins in 1997. They resided in the Hancock Park section of Los Angeles, California. He had a son, Jeffrey.

Jenkins was a part of the worship group of West Angeles Church of God in Los Angeles. He had worked with Bishop Charles E. Blake and participated in many church activities, including church basketball team games.

Jenkins died on April 25, 2019 of a heart attack in Los Angeles, California, at age 63.

Selected filmography

Actor

 M*A*S*H (1979, TV Series) as Private North
 The White Shadow (1979–1981, TV Series) as Wardell Stone / Student
 Quincy, M.E. (1982, TV Series) as Walder
 Lou Grant (1982, TV Series) as Lionel
 Young Doctors in Love (1982) as The Hospital Staff - Paul the Orderly
 Lookin' to Get Out (1982) as Parking Attendant - Brings Up the Car
 Mr. Mom (1983) as Camera Asst.
 Bay City Blues (1983, TV Series) as Lynwood Scott
 T. J. Hooker (1984, TV Series) as Toothpick / Willie Joe Ellington Brown III
 Body Double (1984) as Assistant Director
 Alice (1984, TV Series) as Howie
 Finder of Lost Loves (1985, TV Series) as Lyman Whittaker
 Fletch (1985) as Gummy
 Ferris Bueller's Day Off (1986) as Attendant's Co-Pilot
 Armed and Dangerous (1986) as Raisin
 What's Happening Now!! (1986, TV Series) as The Mailman
 Prison (1987) as Hershey
 The Presidio (1988) as MP Dutton
 Elvira: Mistress of the Dark (1988) as Technical Director
 The Hogan Family (1988, TV Series) as Stew Lyons
 Pucker Up and Bark Like a Dog (1989) as The Head Waiter
 Genuine Risk (1990) as Horseplayer #1
 Home Improvement (1995, TV Series) as Bud
 Brooklyn South (1997, TV Series) as Polo
 Providence (1999, TV Series)
 EDtv (1999) as Husband
 The Fugitive (2001, TV Series) as Antoine Bishop
 To Protect and Serve (2001) as Black Engineer
 Go for Broke 2 (2005) as Detective Loon
 Don't Touch If You Ain't Prayed (2005) as Pastor Bill Worthy
 The Shield (2006, TV Series) as Big D
 House of Grace (2006) as Flash - Crackhead #1
 When a Woman's Fed Up (2013) as Leroy
 The Congregation (2014) as Vernon Pride
 Hunter Gatherer (2016) as Robert fix it guy
 Marriage Vows (2017) as Danny Wills
 Low Town (2017) as Henry Felder

Director
 Don't Touch If You Ain't Prayed (2005)
 House of Grace (2006)
 Marriage Vows (2013)

Producer
 From Lara with Love (2000)
 Brothers in Arms (2005)
 Color of the Cross (2006)
 Sorority Sister Slaughter (2007)
 Marriage Vows (2013)

Writer
 Pastor Jones (2005)
 Don't Touch If You Ain't Prayed (2005)
 House of Grace (2006)

References

External links
 
 
 May 30th 2011 – ActorsE Chat with Actor Larry Flash Jenkins and Director John Michael Ferrari on Actors Entertainment
 Larry "Flash" Jenkins(Aveleyman)

1955 births
2019 deaths
20th-century American male actors
21st-century American male actors
African-American Christians
African-American film directors
African-American male actors
African-American television personalities
African-American television producers
American film directors
American male film actors
American male screenwriters
American male television actors
Film producers from California
Male actors from Los Angeles County, California
Members of the Church of God in Christ
People from Long Island
Screenwriters from California
Television producers from California